St Andrew's College, Drygrange, located near Melrose, Scotland, was a Roman Catholic seminary founded in 1953 and closed in 1986.

History

Foundation
Founded by Gordon Gray shortly after he became Archbishop of St Andrews and Edinburgh, the college was operated by the archdiocese in a large country house called Drygrange House. The house, standing north of the Leaderfoot Viaduct, included sizeable grounds bordered by the River Leader, a tributary of the River Tweed.

Closure
The archdiocese took the decision to close the college with effect from the autumn of 1986. The closure was blamed by then-Archbishop Keith O'Brien, himself a former student of the seminary, on the halving of the number of new Scottish entrants to the priesthood.

The remaining students were transferred to Gillis College, Edinburgh, the new seminary for the archdiocese, and some 2,300 items from the college's library were deposited in the National Library of Scotland.

On another analysis, the new Gillis College was the seminary of St Andrew's, transferred to a new site and renamed.

In 1987, the archdiocese sold the college's former buildings at Drygrange for £250,000 and they became a nursing home called St Andrews Nursing Home, after going into administration it was sold and in March 2001 the new owners changed it to Grange Hall Care Home which has become (Jan 2017) one of the most successful and highest graded care homes in the Scottish Borders.

In 1993, Gillis College also closed, and Chesters College, Bearsden, later renamed Scotus College, became the national seminary for Scotland.

Notable alumni
 Paul Kamuza Bakyenga, Archbishop of Mbarara
 Dennis Canavan, Scottish politician
 Bishop Vincent Logan
 Cardinal Keith O'Brien
 Bishop Stephen Robson

Gallery

See also

 List of listed buildings in Melrose, Scottish Borders
 List of Roman Catholic seminaries
 List of schools in Scotland

References

1953 establishments in Scotland
1986 disestablishments in Scotland
1986 disestablishments in the United Kingdom
Drygrange
Category B listed buildings in the Scottish Borders
Defunct Catholic schools in Scotland
Defunct universities and colleges in Scotland
Educational institutions disestablished in 1986
Educational institutions established in 1953
Listed schools in Scotland
Schools in the Scottish Borders